Simeon II may refer to:

 Pope Simeon II of Alexandria (ruled 830)
 Simeon II, Caucasian Albanian Catholicos in 902–923
 Simeon Saxe-Coburg-Gotha, formerly Tsar Simeon II of Bulgaria (born 1937)

See also
 Simon II (disambiguation)